Vaillant's frog (Lithobates vaillanti) is a species of frog in the family Ranidae found in Central America. Its natural habitats are subtropical or tropical dry forests, subtropical or tropical moist lowland forests, subtropical or tropical swamps, rivers, swamps, freshwater lakes, intermittent freshwater lakes, freshwater marshes, intermittent freshwater marshes, rural gardens, heavily degraded former forests, water storage areas, ponds, and canals and ditches.

References

Further reading
Hillis, D.M., and de Sá, R. (1984): Phylogeny and taxonomy of the Rana palmipes species group (Salientia: Ranidae). Herpetological Monographs 2: 1-26.
Hillis, D.M. & Wilcox, T.P. (2005): Phylogeny of the New World true frogs (Rana). Mol. Phylogenet. Evol. 34(2): 299–314.   PDF fulltext. 
Hillis, D. M. (2007) Constraints in naming parts of the Tree of Life. Mol. Phylogenet. Evol. 42: 331–338.
Pauly, Greg B., Hillis, David M. & Cannatella, David C. (2009): Taxonomic freedom and the role of official lists of species names. Herpetologica 65: 115–128. PDF fulltext

Lithobates
Taxonomy articles created by Polbot
Amphibians described in 1877